Yueh Hua (14 July 1942 – 20 October 2018) was a Shanghai-born Hong Kong actor, later based in Canada, with Shaw Brothers Studio and TVB. Yueh is one of the most versatile and prolific leading actors of Shaw Brothers. Yueh starred in five to ten films per year in his heyday, playing roles ranging from foolish drunks to scholarly warriors. Yueh died of cancer in Vancouver, British Columbia, Canada, aged 76.

Biography
Yueh was born as Leung Lok-wah in Shanghai, with Cantonese ancestry. Yueh emigrated to Hong Kong in 1962 after graduating from Shanghai Conservatory of Music. He joined Shaw Brothers Studio and started his acting career in 1963.

Yueh breakout film role was in the 1966 Come Drink with Me. He was mainly cast in a lead role. Yueh was best known for his role in Looking Back in Anger, one of TVB's popular shows. After his last appearance on screen in 1989, he moved to Canada in the 1990s, where he hosted programs for the Vancouver Chinese radio CHMB. Yueh returned to the entertainment industry in Hong Kong from 2006 to 2015. Yueh is credited with over 130 films.

Filmography

Films 
This is a partial list of films.

TV series

Personal life 
In 1975, Yueh married , an actress. On October 20, 2018, Yueh died in Vancouver, British Columbia, Canada. Ngok was 76 years old.

References

External links 

 Yueh Hua at filmaffinity.com
 Yueh Hua at lovehkfilm.com
 Yueh Hua at hkmemory.hk
 Yueh Hua at thespinningimage.co.uk

Additional sources 
 

Hong Kong Buddhists
Hong Kong male film actors
Hong Kong male television actors
TVB veteran actors
1942 births
2018 deaths
Male actors from Shanghai
20th-century Hong Kong male actors
21st-century Hong Kong male actors
Chinese male film actors
Chinese male television actors
20th-century Chinese male actors
21st-century Chinese male actors
Shanghai Conservatory of Music alumni
Canadian radio hosts